"Little Red Wagon" is a song performed by Audra Mae on her 2012 album Audra Mae and the Almighty Sound. It was covered by Miranda Lambert on her fifth studio album Platinum, and was released as its third single in January 2015.

Recording
Lambert said that she first heard of the song when John Eddie, with whom she had been touring at the time, recommended that she listen to an Audra Mae album. Upon hearing the song, Lambert wanted to record it, and asked Mae for permission to do so.

Critical reception
Giving it a B+, Jon Freeman of Country Weekly wrote that "it's still fun to hear her back in spitfire mode". He praised the "strong use of dynamics" in the production, but thought that the lyrics were "on the silly side of cheeky".

Commercial performance
"Little Red Wagon" debuted at number 60 on the Billboard Country Airplay chart for the week dated January 10, 2015. It also debuted at number 49 on the U.S. Billboard Hot Country Songs chart for the week of August 23, 2014, several months before being released as a single. The song peaked at No. 5 on Hot Country Songs chart for chart dated March 28, 2015, and No. 55 on the Billboard Hot 100 the same week.  As of July 2015, the song has sold 432,000 downloads in the US.

Music video
The music video was directed by Trey Fanjoy and premiered on March 11, 2015. In the video, Lambert is shown checking into a remote motel surrounded by desert. She is shown walking her pet dog, lounging beside the pool, and sitting on one of the motel beds while the motel's housekeeper and receptionist are seen dancing while on the job. The video ends with Lambert leaving in her airstream brandishing a belt that reads 'Mrs. Shelton,' a reference to her marriage with Blake Shelton.

Chart performance

Weekly charts

Year-end charts

Certifications

References

2015 singles
Miranda Lambert songs
RCA Records Nashville singles
2014 songs
Songs written by Audra Mae
Song recordings produced by Frank Liddell
Music videos directed by Trey Fanjoy